Rob Stewart may refer to:

 Rob Stewart (filmmaker) (1979–2017), Canadian filmmaker
 Rob Stewart (actor) (born 1961), Canadian actor

See also
Robert Stewart (disambiguation)